Freak Show is an American adult animated television series that aired on Comedy Central created by H. Jon Benjamin and  David Cross.

The show chronicles a freak show, called the Freak Squad, which reluctantly moonlights as a group of second-rate superheroes employed by the US government.

The only season, which consisted of seven episodes, premiered on October 4, and ended on November 16, 2006. Cross and Benjamin were executive producers in addition to voicing various characters. Radical Axis handled all aspects of production, from initial audio records and character design to final delivery of the master. The series was released on DVD on June 12, 2012.

Cast

The Freak Squad
Benny and Tuck (David Cross and H. Jon Benjamin, respectively) - Conjoined twins, apparent leaders of the Squad. They are the only members of the squad to possess any semblance of responsibility and duty. They are also the only members of the squad to have actual names, as opposed to simply being referred to by their gimmick. Their super power is the ability to separate for up to 47 years at a time.

The Bearded Clam (Janeane Garofalo) - A giant, anthropomorphic clam with a beard, resembling a morbidly obese, middle-aged woman. Raised by eco-terrorists, she possesses numerous left-wing radical political views, has an anarchist symbol in her shell, and is an adherent to radical feminism. She often puts on demonstrations and rallies, at which she is usually the only participant. It has been implied that she has somewhat of a sordid sexual past, revealing that she's engaged in intercourse in such unconventional locales as the cockpit of an F-16. At times she is displayed as a den mother of sorts to the group, counting among her talents the ability to cook three different ways on a wok. In the series finale, she was killed in a clambake by being cooked alive by a group of Orthodox Jews and then fed to "The Jewish Messiah", a giant made up of circumcised foreskins. Her super power is "Acidic Bitch Juice", an extremely potent form of saliva capable of eating through most kinds of metal, that she can project from her mouth.  She also possesses the ability to transform herself into a liquid state, which can then absorb other super-powered individuals and draw upon their abilities to shape shift.

World's Tallest Nebraskan (Brian Stack) - An especially tall man from Nebraska. He is portrayed as the stereotypical "ignorant hick", though he is also the most sensitive member of the Freak Squad, often going out of his way to carefully select words so as to be completely inoffensive, even in situations where upsetting someone else would neither be inappropriate nor even a reality. His super power is the ability to shrink six inches.

Primi the premature baby (David Cross) - A Jewish premature baby with the inexplicable ability to speak and operate a mechanical transport unit. He also inexplicably speaks in metaphors and dead tongues, which apparently only Bearded Clam can understand. He also has some sort of non-American accent, ostensibly Italian. At various points throughout the series, he has been depicted requiring the aid of some sort of incubation unit outfitted with wheels and mechanical gloves in order to be mobile. However, in the season finale, he left the unit and performed acrobatic stunts on his own. His super power is pinpoint vomiting, the ability to vomit at will and direct its flow at any individual he chooses.

Log Cabin Republican (Jon Glaser) - A gay Republican. Usually dressed in a business suit; at times deals with others on behalf of the group.  On October 31, 2006, the character the Log Cabin Republican appeared on an episode of The Colbert Report, in which he was interviewed by the host. His super power is the ability to transform into "Burly Bear", who can run up to 60 mph, climb trees, and decapitate victims with one swipe of his immaculately manicured hands.

Supporting characters
Bob and Helen Hartsdale (Cross and Benjamin respectively) - The kind, older couple who own a freakshow and the Squad. They are often shown as senile people.

Duncan Schiesst (Will Arnett) - Works for Freak-Mart. the world's largest general purpose retailer, trying to purchase Mr. and Mrs. Hartsdale's Freak Show.

Frank Meinkowitz (Todd Barry) - The creator of the Freak Squad who gives them their missions.

World's Smallest Something (Kristen Schaal) - One of the Hartsdale's freaks. It is so small that no one knows its true gender or species. The World's Tallest Nebraskan accidentally stepped on it in the second episode.

Danny the Plumber Guy (Cross) - A parody of Larry the Cable Guy. His catchphrase is "Git to gittn'." a parody of Larry's "Git r done."  Creator David Cross is known for being critical of Daniel Whitney's character and routine.

Episodes

Home media

References

External links
 
 

2006 American television series debuts
2006 American television series endings
2000s American adult animated television series
American adult animated comedy television series
American adult animated superhero television series
American flash adult animated television series
English-language television shows
Comedy Central animated television series
Comedy Central original programming